The Queen Elizabeth Centre (QEC) in Ballarat, Victoria is a part of the Ballarat Health Service.

History 
The QEC was formed in 1859 and opened on 20 February 1860 as the "Ballarat Benevolent Asylum".  It became the Queen Elizabeth Geriatric Centre sometime before 1960 and is now called the Queen Elizabeth Centre.

In 1997, the QEC merged with the Ballarat Base Hospital and the Grampians Psychiatric Service to form the Ballarat Health Service.

References 
Ballarat Historic Timeline
Picture Australia
"Ballarat and its Benevolent Asylum: A Nineteenth-Century Model of Christian Duty, Civic Progress and Social Reform" Helen W. Kinloch, February 2004.

Buildings and structures in Ballarat
Hospitals in Victoria (Australia)
Hospitals established in 1860